Nuestra Belleza Baja California  Sur 2011, was held at the Hotel Presidente Intercontinental in Loas Cabos, Baja California Sur on June 25, 2011. At the conclusion of the final night of competition Jessica García Formenti of La Paz was crowned the winner. García was crowned by outgoing Nuestra Belleza Baja California Sur and Nuestra Belleza Internacional México 2011  Karen Higuera. Eight contestants competed for the title.

Results

Placements

Special awards

Contestants

References

External links
Official Website

Baja California Sur, 2011
Nuestra Belleza, 2011
2011 in Mexico
June 2011 events in Mexico